Fabio Leutenecker (born 15 March 1990) is a German footballer who last played for Chemnitzer FC.

Career
He signed for MSV Duisburg on 16 June 2016. For the 2017–18 season, he moved to Chemnitzer FC.

References

External links

1990 births
Living people
People from Ludwigsburg (district)
Sportspeople from Stuttgart (region)
German footballers
Stuttgarter Kickers II players
Stuttgarter Kickers players
MSV Duisburg players
Chemnitzer FC players
3. Liga players
Footballers from Baden-Württemberg
Association football defenders